The N-Word is a 2004 American documentary film directed and written by Todd Larkins Williams. The movie looks into the history and usage of the word nigger and its variations.

Interviews

Awards 

 2004 Peabody Award winner

See also
Guilty or Innocent of Using the N Word

References

External links 
 

Documentary films about words and language
Documentary films about African Americans
2004 films
Documentary films about racism in the United States
African-American films
2000s English-language films